Dorsa Stille is a wrinkle ridge system at  in Mare Imbrium on the Moon. It is 66 km long and was named after German geologist Hans Stille in 1976.

References

Ridges on the Moon
Mare Imbrium